Wolfgang Reinhardt may refer to:

Wolfgang Reinhardt (producer) (1908–1979), German-American film producer and screenwriter
Wolfgang Reinhardt (athlete) (1943–2011), West German track and field Olympian

See also
Hans-Wolfgang Reinhard (1888–1950), German military leader
Wolfgang Reinhart (born 1956), German political leader; see List of German Christian Democratic Union politicians
Reinhardt (surname)